Certamen, Latin for competition, may refer to:
Certamen Homeri et Hesiodi, a Greek narrative of an imagined poetical agon between Homer and Hesiod
Certamen (quiz bowl), a competition with classics-themed questions

See also
Agon